Nils Löfgren (18 August 1913 – 21 January 1967) was a Swedish chemist who developed the anaesthetic Lidocaine (under the name Xylocaine) in 1943. At this time, he had recently finished his licentiate degree, and was teaching organic chemistry at the University of Stockholm. He and his co-worker Bengt Lundqvist sold the rights to Xylocaine to the Swedish pharmaceutical company Astra AB.

In 1948, Löfgren completed his doctorate, and the title of his dissertation was Studies on local anesthetics: Xylocaine: a new synthetic drug. He later became professor of organic chemistry at the University of Stockholm.

References 

Swedish chemists
20th-century Swedish inventors
1913 births
1967 deaths
20th-century chemists